The Wiener–Hopf method is a mathematical technique widely used in applied mathematics. It was initially developed by Norbert Wiener and Eberhard Hopf as a method to solve systems of integral equations, but has found wider use in solving two-dimensional partial differential equations with mixed boundary conditions on the same boundary. In general, the method works by exploiting the complex-analytical properties of transformed functions.  Typically, the standard Fourier transform is used, but examples exist using other transforms, such as the Mellin transform.

In general, the governing equations and boundary conditions are transformed and these transforms are used to define a pair of complex functions (typically denoted with '+' and '−' subscripts) which are respectively analytic in the upper and lower halves of the complex plane, and have growth no faster than polynomials in these regions.  These two functions will also coincide on some region of the complex plane, typically, a thin strip containing the real line. Analytic continuation guarantees that these two functions define a single function analytic in the entire complex plane, and Liouville's theorem implies that this function is an unknown polynomial, which is often zero or constant.  Analysis of the conditions at the edges and corners of the boundary allows one to determine the degree of this polynomial.

Wiener–Hopf decomposition 
The key step in many Wiener–Hopf problems is to decompose an arbitrary function  into two functions  with the desired properties outlined above.  In general, this can be done by writing

 

and

 

Similarly, arbitrary scalar functions may be decomposed into a product of +/− functions, i.e. , by first taking the logarithm, and then performing a sum decomposition.  Product decompositions of matrix functions (which occur in coupled multi-modal systems such as elastic waves) are considerably more problematic since the logarithm is not well defined, and any decomposition might be expected to be non-commutative.  A small subclass of commutative decompositions were obtained by Khrapkov, and various approximate methods have also been developed.

Example
Consider the linear partial differential equation 

Taking a Fourier transform with respect to  results in the following ordinary differential equation
 
 

If a particular solution of this ordinary differential equation which satisfies the necessary decay at infinity is denoted , a general solution can be written as 
 
where  is an unknown function to be determined by the boundary conditions on =0.

 
 

The boundary conditions then give
 
 

Eliminating  yields
 
where
 

To be precise,  where
 
 
 

This can be done in the same way that we factorised 
Consequently,
 

Now, as the left-hand side of the above equation is analytic in the lower half-plane, whilst the right-hand side is analytic in the upper half-plane, analytic continuation guarantees existence of an entire function which coincides with the left- or right-hand sides in their respective half-planes. Furthermore, since it can be shown that the functions on either side of the above equation decay at large , an application of Liouville's theorem shows that this entire function is identically zero, therefore 

and so

See also 

 Wiener filter
Riemann–Hilbert problem

References 

 
 
 

Partial differential equations